Kalvis Eisaks (born 7 March 1983, in Riga) is a Latvian cyclist.

Palmares
2004
1st  U23 European Road Race Championships
2nd National Time Trial Championships
2008
2nd National Road Race Championships
4th Grand Prix de la Ville de Lillers

References

1983 births
Living people
Latvian male cyclists
Sportspeople from Riga